Observer Media Group, Inc. is a media company that publishes local newspapers and magazines in the U.S. state of Florida. The company publishes twelve newspapers, three quarterly magazines and maintains six news websites.

History
Observer Media Groupstarted when Matt Walsh and Lisa Walsh purchased the Longboat Observer in 1995 from Ralph and Claire Hunter with the help of Lisa's parents and a small group of other investors. The Hunters started the Longboat Observer in 1978.

Since then, Observer Media Group established new local newspapers, such as the Sarasota Observer in 2004, and acquired other older newspapers, such as the 100+ year-old West Orange Times in 2014 and Financial News & Daily Record in 2017. OMG maintains journalistic offices in Tampa, Clearwater, Bradenton, Longboat Key, Lakeland, Sarasota, Fort Myers, Naples, New Port Richey, Winter Garden, Lakewood Ranch, Port Charlotte, Palm Coast, and Ormond Beach. The name was changed to Observer Media Group in 2012 from The Observer Group.

Observer Media acquired Pelican Press from Wisconsin-based Journal Media Group in 2011. Pelican Press serves the Siesta Key area of Florida and in 2013, OMG renamed the paper to Siesta Key Observer to fit its overall branding.

In 2012, The Observer attempted to publish the Palm Coast Observer twice a week, on Wednesdays and Saturdays. With a circulation of 25,000, OMG abandoned the idea and returned to a Thursday-only publishing schedule. The move, however, saw circulation increase to 30,000. "At first glance it looks like we may have an overall increase in ad revenue. And lower delivery cost," observed CEO Matt Walsh at the time. "In any business manual it is a wonderful thing to increase revenue and reduce cost at the same time." August 1, 2013, saw the launch of the Plant City Times & Observer with an initial run of 15,000 copies, the publication was sold to a group of local investors in December, 2018.

In 2016, Emily Walsh was named publisher of several of OMG's assets, including East County Observer, Longboat Observer, Sarasota Observer, Siesta Key Observer, YourObserver.com, Season magazine and LWR Life magazine. As the daughter of the founders, Emily Walsh has worked most of her career for OMG.

Publications
As of 2021, Observer Media Group owns twelve newspapers (directly or indirectly), three magazines and six websites in support of the print editions, reaching more than 441,804 readers per week. OMG works with issuu, the largest digital newsstand, to publish online digital copies of its print material.

References

External links
 
 The Observer Group at issuu

Newspapers published in Florida
Companies based in Sarasota, Florida
1995 establishments in Florida
Mass media companies established in 1995
Mass media companies of the United States
Newspaper companies of the United States